The Great Escape II: The Untold Story is a 1988 American made-for-television action-adventure drama film and a sequel to The Great Escape (1963). It stars Christopher Reeve, Judd Hirsch, Anthony Denison, Ian McShane, Charles Haid and Donald Pleasence in a supporting role (in the 1963 original Pleasence had played Flight-Lieutenant Colin Blythe, "The Forger"). The film was directed by Jud Taylor (in the 1963 original Taylor had played 2nd Lt. Goff). The Great Escape II premiered in two parts on NBC on November 6 and 7, 1988.

The Great Escape II is not a true sequel, as it dramatizes the escape itself, like the original film, but mostly by using the real names of the individuals involved; the original film fictionalized them and used composite characters. The murder of the prisoners is more accurate than in the 1963 original, with the POWs being shot individually or in pairs, but other portions of the film are fictional. It depicts the search for those responsible for the murder of the Allied officers, and the subsequent trials. The film features the exploits of Major Johnnie Dodge (played by Christopher Reeve), an American-born British Army officer and cousin of Winston Churchill, and largely follows his journey to freedom after the escape. The second half of the film is based on the postwar investigation into the murders of fifty of the escapees by the Gestapo, conducted by Dodge and two fictional Americans (whereas in fact it was conducted by the Royal Air Force Special Investigation Branch).

Plot
A former POW leads a special task force to hunt down the culprits responsible for carrying out the orders to murder 50 of the 76 escapees from Stalag Luft III.

Cast

 Klaus Grünberg as Erich Zacharias
 Vladan Živković as Pankrac Prison Warden (uncredited)

Release

Home media
When released on VHS, nearly an hour and a half of footage was cut out from the film.

Reception

Critical response
The film was nominated for the Outstanding Sound Mixing for a Miniseries or a Special award at the Primetime Emmy Awards.

References

External links

DVD release 

World War II prisoner of war films
American sequel films
1988 television films
1988 films
Television sequel films
NBC network original films
World War II films based on actual events
Films about prison escapes
Films about World War II crimes
Films directed by Jud Taylor
Films directed by Paul Wendkos
Films set in Berlin
Films set in Czechoslovakia
Films set in Germany
Films set in Hamburg
Films set in Heidelberg
Films set in London
Films set in Poland
Films set in Salzburg
Films set in Vienna
Films set in 1944
Films set in 1945

Films about capital punishment